The Kelantanese klewang or Kelantanese kelewang (Kelewang Kelantan or Klewang Kelantan in Malay language or Keleweng Kelate in Kelantanese Malay) is a style of klewang originating from Kelantan, Malaysia but also popular in other northern Malaysia Peninsula states. The Kelantanese klewang is believed to be as old as the parang, became a distinct weapon by the late 18th century. In the 19th century, Kelantanese men would wear the Kelantantese klewang behind their sarong with the blade protruding out.

The weapon features a single edged, curved belly blade, with its tapered tip clipped and forming decorative loop or spike at the spine of the blade. The handle is carved to the shape of a horse hoof or a Makara (Hindu mythology).

The Kelantanese klewang is used in martial arts but it is also often associated with violent gang crimes. In 2012, about a dozen of gang members from 3 different gangs in Kelantan were arrested for 10 cases of assault, armed-robbery and confiscation of weapons including the kelewang.

There are variety of Kelantanese klewangs such as Kelewang Pucuk Berkait, Kelewang Jambul and so on.

This weapon was featured in the American bladesmthing competition, Forged in Fire (TV series)'s season 5 episode 15.

References

Blade weapons
Southeast Asian swords
Weapons of Malaysia